Prostate cancer associated transcript 18 (non-protein coding) is a protein that in humans is encoded by the PCAT18 gene.

This gene was described by Crea et al as a prostate cancer-specific transcript activated by the androgen receptor.

References